Thunder is the first solo album by British guitarist and former Duran Duran and the Power Station member Andy Taylor, released in 1987 on MCA Records. It features former Sex Pistols guitarist Steve Jones on guitar.

The album went out of print in 1990, but reemerged in a newly expanded version on online music services like iTunes when Taylor made his entire catalog available in 2010. In addition to the original version of Thunder, Taylor's previous solo singles such as "Take It Easy" were included as well.

British hard rock band Thunder would later take their name in partial reference to this album.

Track listing
All songs are written by Andy Taylor and Steve Jones except "Broken Window", written by Taylor alone.

Personnel
Andy Taylor – lead vocals, guitars
Steve Jones – guitars
Mickey Curry – drums
Patrick O'Hearn – bass guitar
Brett Tuggle – keyboards
Paulinho Da Costa – percussion
Mark Volman – backing vocals
Howard Kaylan – backing vocals

Production
Producers: Andy Taylor, Steve Jones
Engineer: George Tutko
Mixer: Jeff Hendrickson
Assistant engineer: Paul Wertheimer
Mastering: Brian Gardner at Bernie Grundman Mastering, Hollywood, CA
Photography: Jim Shea
Art direction and design: Kosh

References

1987 debut albums
Andy Taylor (guitarist) albums
MCA Records albums
Albums produced by Steve Jones (musician)